Yuri Vella (1948 - Sept. 2013), full name Yurii Kilevich Aivaseda, known by his pseudonym Yuri Vella, was a writer, poet, environmentalist and social activist of the Forest Nenets people from Western Siberia.

Biography  
Yuri Vella was born in the Varyogan village in Siberia in 1948. In the 1990s, he moved with his family from the Varyogan village to the tundra of the Agan River to revive the traditional Nenets way of life and become a reindeer herder.

He was a writer and poet writing in the Forest Nenets language, the Khanty language and in Russian. He was a social activist - in 1990, he organised a protest on behalf of the Nenets people in the Varegansk area, Yamal, against the gas and oil industry expanding into the Yamal. The energy industry was destroying the environment, killing the reindeer, and displacing and persecuting the indigenous people. The protest was recorded by Russian TV.

In 1996, he created a small Taiga school to teach the traditional reindeer herding skills to Nenets children. The school was closed in 2009, when the attending children grew older and left for other education.

In 2008, a documentary film about Vella, called Yuri Vella's world - the DER documentary, was created by Liivo Niglas.

Bibliography 

The following works of Vella were published in the 2010 anthology Way of Kinship: Anthology of Native Siberian Literature, pages 78-93 
 At the Bus Stop 
 Watching TV 
 On Things Eternal 
 To the Bear 
 Song of the Reindeer Breeder 
 Eternal Sky 
 The Little Shaman and Other Stories 
 Morning at the Lake 
 Fyodor the Hunter 
 News from Vatyegan Camp

Vella's poem "To the Bear" was also published in the anthology Grrrrr: A Collection of Poems about Bears, published by Arctos Press, 2000, .

References 

1948 births
2013 deaths
Nenets people